Daria Andreyevna Vaskina (born 30 July 2002) is a Russian swimmer. She competed in the women's 100 metre backstroke at the 2019 World Aquatics Championships.

References

External links
 

 
 
 

2002 births
Living people
Russian female freestyle swimmers
Russian female backstroke swimmers
Swimmers at the 2018 Summer Youth Olympics
Youth Olympic gold medalists for Russia
Swimmers from Moscow
World Aquatics Championships medalists in swimming